Refn is a surname. Notable people with the surname include:

 Anders Refn (born 1944), Danish cutter, film director, and screenwriter
  (1908–1985), Danish artist
 Nicolas Winding Refn (born 1970), Danish film director, screenwriter, and producer, son of Anders